= Al qufl =

Al qufl may refer to:

- Al qufl, Hadhramaut, Yemen
- Al qufl, San‘a’, Yemen
